Johann Weber (19 June 1828 (or 1823) – 23 April 1878) was a Swiss politician and President of the Swiss Council of States (1869/1870). He was born in Seeberg.

External links 

1828 births
1878 deaths
People from Oberaargau District
Swiss Calvinist and Reformed Christians
Members of the National Council (Switzerland)
Members of the Council of States (Switzerland)
Presidents of the Council of States (Switzerland)